Fox Movies may refer to:

 20th Century Studios, an American film studio formerly known as 20th Century Fox
 Fox Movie Channel, former name of FX Movie Channel, an American television channel that airs movies
 Fox Film Corporation, a defunct movie studio
 Fox Action Movies, an Asian television channel that airs action and horror movies
 Fox Family Movies, an Asian television channel that airs family-friendly blockbuster movies
 Fox Movies (TV channel), a set of international movie channels by Fox Network Group
 Fox Movies (Southeast Asian TV channel), a channel airing blockbuster movies regardless of genre

See also
Fox (disambiguation)
FX (disambiguation)